Samuel Kojo Abbey (born 31 August 1997) is a Ghanaian footballer who plays for Kasuka FC of the Brunei Super League as a center-back. He has also played for teams in Ghana, Kenya, Uganda and Myanmar.

Career
Abbey was playing in the lower divisions of Ghana's football pyramid when he first moved abroad to Kitengela Shooters in Kenya. He then transferred to JMC Hippos who were playing in the 2015–16 Uganda Super League. He next moved to Mawyawadi FC of the MNL-2, Myanmar's second-tier club competition, in 2017. He stayed there until 2019 when he joined Dagon FC who were promoted to the 2019 Myanmar National League, and played 11 games for the Yangon side until they suffered relegation on the final day of the season.

In 2021, Abbey signed for Kasuka FC of the Brunei Super League. He scored a hat-trick in his debut in a 1–11 win against Panchor Murai FC on 20 June, becoming the first foreigner to score a hat-trick in the Brunei Super League.

Abbey stayed with Kasuka the following year and picked up a runners-up medal at the 2022 Brunei FA Cup, beaten by DPMM FC in the final on 4 December of that year.

References

1997 births
Association football defenders
Expatriate footballers in Brunei
Expatriate footballers in Kenya
Expatriate footballers in Myanmar
Expatriate footballers in Uganda
Footballers from Accra
Ghanaian expatriate footballers
Living people
Ghanaian expatriate sportspeople in Kenya